The T2 tanker, or T2, was a class of oil tanker constructed and produced in large quantities in the United States during World War II. Only the T3 tankers were larger "navy oilers" of the period. Some 533 T2s were built between 1940 and the end of 1945. They were used to transport fuel oil, diesel fuel, gasoline and sometimes black oil-crude oil. Post war many T2s remained in use; like other hastily built World War II ships pressed into peacetime service, there were safety concerns. As was found during the war, the United States Coast Guard Marine Board of Investigation in 1952 stated that in cold weather the ships were prone to metal fatigue cracking, so were "belted" with steel straps. Pendletons sinking is memorialized in The Finest Hours. Engineering inquiries into the problem suggested the cause was poor welding techniques. It was found the steel (that had been successfully used in riveted ship design) was not well suited for the new wartime welding construction. The high sulfur content made the steel brittle and prone to metal fatigue at lower temperatures.

Designs

T2 design
The T2 design was formalized by the United States Maritime Commission as its medium-sized "National Defense tanker", a ship built for merchant service which could be militarized as a fleet auxiliary in time of war. MarCom subsidized the excess cost of naval features beyond normal commercial standards. The T2 was based on two ships built in 1938–1939 by Bethlehem Steel for Socony-Vacuum Oil Company, Mobilfuel and Mobilube, differing from the Mobil ships principally in the installation of more powerful engines for higher speed.

T2-A design
All five were requisitioned by the Navy during the war and converted to fleet oilers as the Mattaponi class.

T2-SE-A1
By far the most common variety of the T2-type tanker was the T2-SE-A1, another commercial design already being built in 1940 by the Sun Shipbuilding Company for Standard Oil Company of New Jersey. After Pearl Harbor, the United States Maritime Commission ordered this model built en masse to supply U.S. warships already in accelerated production, and provide for the fuel needs of US forces in Europe and the Pacific, as well as to replace the tanker tonnage being lost at an alarming rate to German U-boats. 481 were built in extremely short production times by the Alabama Drydock and Shipbuilding Company of Mobile, Alabama, the Kaiser Company at their Swan Island Yard at Portland, Oregon, the Marinship Corp. of Sausalito, California, and the Sun Shipbuilding and Drydock Company of Chester, Pennsylvania. During that period, average production time from laying of the keel to "fitting out" was 70 days. The record, however, was held by Marinship, which had   ready for sea trials in just 33 days.

T2-SE-A2 and -A3
The T2-SE-A2 variation, built only by Marinship of Sausalito, was nearly identical to the T2-SE-A1 version, except with  rather than 7,240. The A3 variation was essentially an A2 built as a naval oiler from the start, rather than converted later as many A2s were.

T3-S-A1

T2-A-MC-K
T2-A-MC-K had a M.C. deadweight tonnage of 16,300 and a full load tonnage of 22,445. The dimensions were: Length: , Beam:  and max. draft: . The first Navy commissioning  was in 1942. could hold 117,400 Bbls of oil and 595,000 gal of gasoline. Crew of 23 officers and 329 enlisted men. Armament: one single 5'/38 cal dual purpose gun mount, four single 3"/50 cal dual purpose gun mounts, four twin 40 mm AA gun mounts and twelve single 20 mm AA gun mounts.

Notable deployments
In 1966, the US Army reactivated 11 T2 tankers and converted them into floating electrical power generation plants and deployed them to Vietnam. The ships' propulsion systems' electrical turbines were used to generate electricity for on-shore use, drawing on fuel from the ships' 150,000-barrel holds.

Notable incidents

Navy service 

  broke in two in 1943. At 11 pm on 16 January 1943, a few days after completing her sea trials, the 501-foot-long T2 tanker Schenectady broke in two amidships while lying at the outfitting dock in the constructors yard in Portland, Oregon. The hull failure was sudden and accompanied by a report that was heard a mile away. Schenectady, built by a Kaiser Shipyard, was the first catastrophic T2 hull failure, made all the more impressive by the still conditions under which it occurred. The failure of Schenectady initiated on the deck between two bulkheads and ran down to the keel (see photo). A defective weld was present in a region of stress concentration arising at a design detail point. Poor welding procedures were cited by the committee investigating the failure as contributory; however, at that time the metallurgical problems were not fully understood.
 SS Caddo (1942) sank on 23 November 1942 after being hit by a torpedo from the U-boat  in the North Atlantic while en route to Iceland. She had 8 survivors of the 59 men aboard. Also known as SS Dorchester Heights.
She was bound for Philadelphia with crude oil. She lost 57 of her 72 crew.
 SS Bloody Marsh sank on 2 July 1943 after being hit by a torpedo from U-66. She lost three of her 77 crew.
She sank in the Gulf of Mexico while en route to New York from Houston, Texas.
She was in convoy CU 36, en route to Loch Ewe, Scotland.
  broke in two, sank at pier in Boston, and was raised and scrapped in 1947.
 SS Nickajack Trail sank on 30 March 1946 in Eniwetok Harbor at Enewetak Atoll on trip from Port Arthur to Yokohama.
 SS Glenn's Ferry sank on 6 October 1945 at Batag Island, Philippines on a trip from Los Angeles to Manila after an explosion.

Commercial service 
 SS Bemis Heights sank on 5 November 1948 off Quoin Point, South Africa on trip from Santos to Abadan.
 , broke in two on 18 February 1952
 , broke in two on 18 February 1952
 SS Salem Maritime exploded on 17 January 1956 while taking on a load of fuel in Lake Charles, Louisiana. 18 crew members on board were killed, including the oncoming and the retiring Master; as well as 3 personnel ashore when the No. 8 port fuel tank exploded in flames. The Salem Maritime and three tank barges in close proximity and shore installations were severely damaged.
 SS Midway Hills sank 2 October 1961 after she broke in two from an engine room explosion. She sank 110 miles east from Jacksonville, Florida, on a trip from Houston to Perth Amboy, New Jersey.

  and its crew of 39 disappeared near the southern coast of Florida after 4 February 1963.
 SS Bunker Hill sank 6 March 1964 after an explosion, she broke in two near Anacortes, Washington on a trip from Tacoma, Washington to Anacortes.
 SS White Bird Canyon sank on 17 December 1964 with loss of all the crew in bad weather off Ulak Island, Aleutians on trip from Vancouver to Yokohama.
 SS Rainier (T2-SE-A1) built by Swan Island. After World War II was sold to private company in 1948. Was converted to bulk cargo ship on 1962, was wrecked and sank on 22 December 1965 off Faja Grande Lighthouse, Flores, Azores as SS Papadiamandis.
 SS Fort Schuyler (T2-SE-A1) fire started in engine room, then was damaged by explosions and sank on 24 October 1966 off the coast of Morgan City, Louisiana.
 SS Ninety-Six sank on 3 March 1971 after starting to leak in storm in the Indian Ocean, on trip from Bunbury, Western Australia, to Savannah.
 , a T2 tanker, lost 1 February 1972 mistakenly believed to have been lost in the Bermuda Triangle
 SS Belridge Hills Sank 24 December 1972 in gale storm 800 miles south of Kodiak on trip from Vancouver to Yokohama.
 , a T2 Tanker that in 1977 collided with a drawbridge in Virginia in a spectacular and costly accident.
 , a T2 tanker that sank in a 1983 storm, the investigation of which led to major reforms in ship inspections and safety standards.
 Delta Conveyor sank in the Mississippi River adjacent to Delta Bulk Terminal in Convent, Louisiana. Raised in two sections: the bow in early 2003 and the aft section in late 2003.

See also
 
 List of Type T2 Tanker names
 Liberty ship
 Type C1 ship
 Type C2 ship
 United States Merchant Marine Academy
 United States Navy oiler
 Victory ship

References

Notes

Bibliography 
 
 Ship Failure Laid to Steel, Welding New York Times, March 18, 1943

External links

 The T2 Tanker page
 T-tanker list

 
Ship types
World War II tankers of the United States